Group C of the 2019 Africa Cup of Nations took place from 23 June to 1 July 2019. The group consisted of Algeria, Kenya, Senegal and Tanzania.

Algeria and Senegal advanced to the round of 16.

Teams

Notes

Standings

In the round of 16:
 The winners of Group C, Algeria, advanced to play the third-placed team of Group B, Guinea.
 The runners-up of Group C, Senegal, advanced to play the runners-up of Group A, Uganda.

Matches

Senegal vs Tanzania

Algeria vs Kenya

Senegal vs Algeria

Kenya vs Tanzania

Kenya vs Senegal

Tanzania vs Algeria

References

External links
 

2019 Africa Cup of Nations